Gerrit Jan Schutte (24 May 1939 – 25 January 2022) was a Dutch politician and teacher. A member of the defunct Reformed Political League (GPV) now merged into the Christian Union (CU), he served as party leader from 1981 to 2001.

Early life
After finishing high school in 1956 Schutte started working as a civil servant for the municipality of Giessenburg. He would work in the same function for the municipalities of Schoonhoven, Elst en Nieuwpoort. In 1968 until 1981 he was deputy-secretary, the second highest civil servant, of the municipality of Zeist.  In the same years he followed a number of educations specializing in governing in local governments.  From 1969 until 1974 he also taught Law for Municipalities.

Politics
From 1974 until 1978 Schutte became a member of the States-Provincial of the province of Utrecht for the Reformed Political League. In 1981 he was elected in the Dutch House of Representatives. He was the only representative of his party and, because of that, Parliamentary group leader. In 1989 the party did get a second seat in Parliament and until his resignation in 2001 he worked together with Eimert van Middelkoop. In these years Schutte would become renowned as the Constitutional law conscience  of the Parliament. He felt that other politicians didn't pay enough attention to the Constitutional laws.

Later life and death
After his resignation, Schutte served as a member of the Select Board. He also investigated fraud of a number of Dutch institutions in the Higher education and was a member of the committee which was involved in preparing the Treaty establishing a Constitution for Europe.

Schutte was a columnist of the Friesch Dagblad and the Persunie. He was the father of six children and was a member of the Reformed Churches in the Netherlands (Liberated). He died after a short illness on 25 January 2022, at the age of 82.

Decorations

References

External links

Official
  G.J. (Gert) Schutte Parlement & Politiek

 
 
 
 

1939 births
2022 deaths
Christian Union (Netherlands) politicians
Dutch columnists
Dutch political party founders
Dutch political writers
Knights of the Order of the Netherlands Lion
Knights of the Order of Orange-Nassau
Leaders of political parties in the Netherlands
Members of the House of Representatives (Netherlands)
Members of the Provincial Council of Utrecht
People from Liesveld
People from Zeist
Reformed Churches (Liberated) Christians from the Netherlands
Reformed Political League politicians
20th-century Dutch civil servants
20th-century Dutch educators
20th-century Dutch male writers
20th-century Dutch politicians
21st-century Dutch civil servants
21st-century Dutch male writers
21st-century Dutch politicians